The Xiaozhai Tiankeng, also known as the Xiaozhai Heavenly Pit, is the world's deepest sinkhole and also the largest in the Shaanxi cluster. It is located in Fengjie County of Chongqing Municipality in China.

Dimensions 
Its volume is 119,349,000 m³ and the area of its opening is 274,000 m2. This material has been dissolved and carried away by the river. Between both these steps is a sloping ledge, formed due to soil trapped in the limestone. In the rainy season, a waterfall can be seen at the mouth of the sinkhole.

Discovery 
The Xiaozhai Tiankeng has been well known to local people since ancient times. Xiaozhai is the name of an abandoned village nearby and literally means "little village", and "Tiankeng" means Heavenly Pit, a unique regional name for sinkholes in China. A 2,800-step staircase has been constructed in order to facilitate tourism.

Underground river and cave 

The Tiankeng formed over the Difeng cave, which in turn had been formed by a powerful underground river which still flows underneath the sinkhole. Both the river and Difeng Cave were explored and mapped by China Caves Project in 1994.

Flora and fauna 
1,285 species of plants, including the ginkgo, and many rare animals like the clouded leopard and Chinese Giant Salamander have been found in the sinkhole.

References 

Sinkholes of Asia
Geologic formations of China